Óscar Laguna García (born 21 February 1978) is a Spanish former professional road racing cyclist. He rode in three editions of the Vuelta a España, in 2001, 2002, and 2003.

Major results
2001
 1st Stage 5 Volta a Catalunya
 6th Overall Vuelta a Murcia
2004
 1st Stage 4 Vuelta a Aragón
2006
 1st  Overall Vuelta a Galicia
1st Stages 3 & 5
2007
 1st  Overall Vuelta a Galicia

References

1978 births
Living people
Spanish male cyclists
People from Berguedà
Sportspeople from the Province of Barcelona
Cyclists from Catalonia
21st-century Spanish people